Social media intelligence (SMI or SOCMINT) refers to the collective tools and solutions that allow organizations to analyze conversations, respond to social signals and synthesize social data points into meaningful trends and analysis, based on the user's needs. Social media intelligence allows one to utilize intelligence gathering from social media sites, using both intrusive or non-intrusive means, from open and closed social networks. This type of intelligence gathering is one element of OSINT (Open- Source Intelligence).

The term was coined in a 2012 paper written by Sir David Omand, Jamie Bartlett and Carl Miller for the Centre for the Analysis of Social Media, at the London-based think tank, Demos.

The authors argued that social media is now an important part of intelligence and security work, but that technological, analytical and regulatory changes are needed before it can be considered a powerful new form of intelligence, including amendments to the United Kingdom Regulation of Investigatory Powers Act 2000.

Given the dynamic evolution of social media and social media monitoring, our current understanding of how social media monitoring can help organisations to create business value is inadequate. As a result, there is a need to study how organisations can (a) extract and analyse social media data related to their business (Sensing), and (b) utilise external intelligence gained from social media monitoring for specific business initiatives (Seizing).

Research shows that various social media platforms on Internet such as Twitter, Tumblr (micro-blogging websites), Facebook (a popular social networking website), YouTube (largest video sharing and hosting website), Blogs and discussion forums are being misused by extremist groups for spreading their beliefs and ideologies, promoting radicalization, recruiting members and creating online virtual communities sharing a common agenda. Popular microblogging websites such as Twitter are being used as a real-time platform for information sharing and communication during planning and mobilization of civil unrest related events.

In a broad sense, social media refers to a conversational, distributed mode of content generation, dissemination, and communication among communities. Different from broadcast-based traditional and industrial media, social media has torn down the boundaries between authorship and readership, while the information consumption and dissemination process is becoming intrinsically intertwined with the process of generating and sharing information.

See also
 Algorithmic curation
 Ambient awareness
 Collective influence algorithm
 Information retrieval
 Media intelligence
 Open-source intelligence
 Sentiment analysis
 Social cloud computing
 Social media analytics
 Social media mining
 Social software
 Virtual collective consciousness

References

External links 
 
 Goolike

Social media
Social media management
Social information processing
Collective intelligence
Surveillance
Intelligence gathering disciplines
Mass media monitoring
Open-source intelligence